Piotr Roman Waśko (22 February 1961 – 29 January 2023) was a Polish politician. A member of the Civic Platform, he served in the Sejm from 2007 to 2011.

Waśko died on 29 January 2023, at the age of 61.

References

1961 births
2023 deaths
21st-century Polish politicians
Civic Platform politicians
Members of the Polish Sejm 2007–2011
Adam Mickiewicz University in Poznań alumni
People from Czarnków